W Aquilae (W Aql) is a variable star in the constellation of Aquila. It is a type of evolved star known as an S-type star. Due to its relatively close distance of 1,200 light-years (370 pc) and equatorial location, it is easy to observe and heavily studied.

Description
W Aquilae is an S-type star with a spectral type of S3,9e to S6,9e, a red giant similar to M-type stars, but in which the dominant spectrum oxides are formed by metals of the fifth period of the periodic table. W Aquilae is also rich in the element technetium. Another feature of this class of stars is the stellar mass loss, in the case of W Aquilae is estimated at  solar masses per year. Its effective temperature varies between 2,300 and 3,000 K and its diameter between 400 and 480 solar radii. It is also a very luminous star, 7,500 times more than the sun.

Variability

W Aquilae is a variable whose brightness oscillates between magnitude +7.3 and +14.3 over a period of 490.43 days. In Mira variables (which are named after Mira, the prototype), this instability comes from pulsation in the stellar surface, causing changes in color and brightness. W Aquilae, a Mira variable, shows silicon monoxide maser emission.

Companion
A magnitude 14.8 companion has been detected 0.47" SW of W Aquilae. This is fainter than W Aquilae at minimum and corresponds to an absolute magnitude of +7.1. Although that absolute magnitude would correspond to a K4 main sequence star, a spectrum was classified as F5 or F8. The separation between the two stars is 160 AU.

Planet X
A 2014 study of W Aquilae and α Centauri with the ALMA array claimed to have accidentally detected a previously-unknown Solar System object. This received widespread press coverage as a potential discovery of planet X. The paper was withdrawn without being accepted for peer-reviewed publication.

References

S-type stars
Mira variables
Aquila (constellation)
Aquila, W
J19152335-0702503
IRAS catalogue objects
Binary stars
F-type main-sequence stars
Emission-line stars